Dennis Iapichino (born 27 July 1990) is a Swiss footballer who plays for Sion. He also holds Italian citizenship.

Club career

Switzerland
Iapichino was loaned by FC Basel to FC Biel-Bienne for part of the 2009-2010 season. He played 12 games for the second division side.

He was loaned out next to FC Lugano for the 2010-2011 season, playing 25 league games and 2 Swiss Cup games. The move was made permanent for the 2011-2012 season.

Major League Soccer

Montreal Impact
Iapichino signed with expansion side Montreal Impact of Major League Soccer on 11 July 2012. He parted ways with the club on 7 August 2013.

D.C. United
Iapichino signed with MLS club D.C. United on 15 August 2013.

Italy

Loan to Servette
On 25 January 2019, he joined Servette on loan until the end of the 2018–19 season.

Servette
On 1 July 2019, transfer to Servette was made permanent.

Sion
On 14 September 2020, he moved to Sion.

Honours
Montreal Impact 
 Canadian Championship (Voyageurs Cup) : 2013

References

External links
 
 

1990 births
People from Frauenfeld
Swiss people of Italian descent
Citizens of Italy through descent
Living people
Swiss men's footballers
Switzerland under-21 international footballers
FC Frauenfeld players
FC Basel players
FC Biel-Bienne players
FC Lugano players
CF Montréal players
D.C. United players
FC Winterthur players
A.C.N. Siena 1904 players
U.S. Livorno 1915 players
Servette FC players
FC Sion players
Swiss Challenge League players
Major League Soccer players
Serie B players
Serie C players
Swiss Super League players
Swiss expatriate footballers
Swiss expatriate sportspeople in Canada
Expatriate soccer players in Canada
Swiss expatriate sportspeople in the United States
Expatriate soccer players in the United States
Association football defenders
Sportspeople from Thurgau